Royal Worcester is a porcelain brand based in Worcester, England. It was established in 1751 and is believed to be the oldest or second oldest remaining English porcelain brand still in existence today, although this is disputed by Royal Crown Derby, which claims 1750 as its year of establishment. Part of the Portmeirion Group since 2009, Royal Worcester remains in the luxury tableware and giftware market, although production in Worcester itself has ended.

Technically, the Worcester Royal Porcelain Co. Ltd. (known as Royal Worcester) was formed in 1862, and although the company had a royal warrant of appointment from 1788, wares produced before that time, as well as those produced at two other factories in Worcester, are known as Worcester porcelain.  The enterprise has followed the pattern of other leading English porcelain brands, with increasing success during the 18th and 19th centuries, then a gradual decline during the 20th century, especially the latter half.

Early history
Prior to 1751, John Wall, a physician, and William Davis, an apothecary, attempted to develop a method of making porcelain that could then be used to boost prosperity and employment in Worcester. The success of their early experimentation is unknown, but they clearly came into contact around 1750–1751 with the Bristol porcelain manufactory of Lund and Miller, who were using soaprock (steatite) as a prime raw material in their porcelain production. This appears to be a then-unique method for producing porcelain.

In 1751, Wall and Davis persuaded a group of 13 businessmen to invest in a new factory at Warmstry House, Worcester, England, on the banks of the River Severn, but whether the business plan put forward to the prospective partners was based on the future buy out of Lund's Bristol porcelain factory is uncertain. Wall and Davis secured the sum of £4500 from the partners to establish the factory, known then as "The Worcester Tonquin Manufactory"; the original partnership deeds are still housed in the Museum of Worcester Porcelain.

Richard Holdship, a Quaker and major shareholder, was prominent in the process of the subsequent ‘buy out’ of the Bristol manufactory in early 1752. Holdship personally bought from Benjamin Lund, a fellow Quaker, the soaprock licence that ensured the mining of 20 tons p.a. of soaprock from Cornwall.

The early wares were soft-paste porcelain with bodies that contained soaprock, commonly called in most ceramic circles as soapstone.  The chemical analyses of these wares closely correlates to those of the Bristol manufactory. This places Worcester in a group of early English potteries including Caughley and factories in Liverpool.

The Flight and Barr partnerships 

In 1783, the factory was purchased by Thomas Flight—the former London sales agent for the concern—for £3,000. He let his two sons run the concern, with John Flight taking the lead role till his death in 1791. In 1788 George III, following a visit to the company, granted it a royal warrant, and it became known as the "Royal Porcelain Works". Knowledge of this period is largely a result of the excellent diary that John Flight kept from 1785 to 1791. This is discussed in detail in Appendix III of Flight & Barr Worcester Porcelain by Henry Sandon.

During this period, the factory was in poor repair. Production was limited to low-end patterns of mostly Blue and White porcelains after Chinese porcelain designs of the period. It was also pressured by competition from inexpensive Chinese export porcelain, and from Thomas Turner's Caughley (pronounced "Calf-ley") Factory.

Martin Barr joined the firm as a partner in 1792; porcelains of this period are often identified by an incised capital "B" and, later, by more elaborate printed and impressed marks.

Thomas Flight died in 1800, leaving the factory in the hands of his son Joseph Flight and Martin Barr. Barr's sons Martin Barr Jr. and George Barr were being prepared at that time to run the factory.  In addition to the warrant granted by George III, royal warrants were also issued by the Prince of Wales in 1807, and the Princess of Wales in 1808.

Chamberlain and Grainger factories
"Worcester porcelain" also includes the hard-paste porcelain wares made in Chamberlain's Factory and Grainger's Factory, as they tend to be referred to in catalogues and museum descriptions.  Both of these began as decorating shops in Worcester, painting "blanks" made by other factories, but after a few years began to make their own porcelain.  Chamberlain's Factory, which was very high quality and in 1811 received its own royal warrant from the Prince Regent, had begun to manufacture by 1791.  In 1840, at a time when both businesses were having difficulties keeping up with a changing market, it merged with the main Flight and Barr concern as "Chamberlain & Company.

Grainger's Factory was making porcelain from 1807, though not of quite the highest quality. Under a succession of partnership and company names the Grainger family retained significant shares until the death of the last member in 1889, when Royal Worcester took them over. As Grainger & Co the factory and name were used until 1902, when a full transfer to the main factory took place.  Some Grainger moulds remained in use in the 21st century. The factory site at St Martin’s Gate was used from 1809 to 1902.

Worcester Porcelain Museum

The factory's former site includes the independent Museum of Royal Worcester (formerly known as the 'Dyson Perrins Museum' and 'Worcester Porcelain Museum') owned by the Dyson Perrins Museum Trust. The Museum houses the world’s largest collection of Worcester porcelain. The collections date back to 1751 and the Victorian gallery, the ceramic collections, archives and records of factory production, form the primary resource for the study of Worcester porcelain and its history.

Porcelain painters
Artists and designers who worked for the factory included Thomas Baxter, William Billingsley, John Stinton, David Bates, James Hadley, Christopher Dresser, Charles Baldwin, Harry Davis and Peter Ewence.  A number of Royal Worcester fruit painters from the late 19th century onwards are known to collectors.

Modern history

In the 20th century, Royal Worcester's most popular pattern has been "Evesham Gold", first offered in 1961, depicting the autumnal fruits of the Vale of Evesham with fine gold banding on an "oven to table" body.

After the 1976 merger with Spode, and due to heavy competition from overseas, the production was switched to factories in Stoke and abroad. 100 staff were made redundant in 2003, and another 100 went in 2005. Fifteen porcelain painters left the Severn Street factory on Friday 29 September 2006, together with 100 other workers. The last trading date for Royal Worcester was 14 June 2009.

The company went into administration on 6 November 2008 and on 23 April 2009, the brand name and intellectual property were acquired by Portmeirion Pottery Group – a pottery and homewares company based in Stoke-on-Trent. As Portmeirion Group has a factory in Stoke-on-Trent, the purchase did not include the Royal Worcester and Spode manufacturing facilities.

References

Battie, David, ed., Sotheby's Concise Encyclopedia of Porcelain, 1990, Conran Octopus,

Further reading

Richard William Binns. A century of potting in the city of Worcester: being the history of the Royal Porcelain Works, from 1751 to 1851 (B. Quaritch, 1865).
Royal Porcelain Works. A guide through the Royal Porcelain Work (1895).
 Henry Sandon. The Illustrated Guide to Worcester Porcelain 1751–1793. Praeger, New York. 1969.
  Lawrence Branyan, Neal French, John Sandon. Worcester Blue & White Porcelain 1751–1790. Vintage/Ebury (A Division of Random House Group). 1981. 
 Gerald Coke. In Search of James Giles. Micawber. Saint Paul. 1983.
 Simon Spero. Worcester Porcelain: The Klepser Collection. Alan Wofsy Fine Arts. .
 Franklin Allen Barrett. Worcester Porcelain & Lund's Bristol. Faber & Faber. 1966.
 Geoffrey A. Godden. Caughley & Worcester Porcelains 1775–1800. Barrie & Jenkins, 1969. .
 F. Severne Mackenna. Worcester Porcelain, The Wall Period and its Antecedents. F. Lewis, 1950.
 H. Rissik Marshall. Coloured Worcester Porcelain of the First Period 1751–1783. Ceramic Book Company, 1954.
 Dinah Reynolds. Worcester Porcelain: Marshall Collection (Ashmolean Handbooks). Ashmolean Museum, 2006. 
 Simon Spero, John Sandon. Worcester Porcelain 1751–1790, The Zorensky Collection. Antique Collectors Club Dist A/C, 2007. 
 Geoffrey A. Godden. Chamberlain-Worcester Porcelain: 1788–1852. First Glance Books, 1996. 
 Henry Sandon. Flight and Barr Worcester Porcelain 1783–1840. ACC Distribution, 1993. 
 Peter Woodger. James Hadley & Sons Artist Potters Worcester. Woodger-Great Britain, 2003. 
 Henry Sandon, John Sandon. Grainger's Worcester Porcelain. David & Charles, 1990. 
 Harris & Willis. An Exhibition of Porcelain Manufactured by E. Locke & Co. Worcester. 1989.
 Henry Sandon. Royal Worcester Porcelain 1862 to the Present Day. Clarkson N. Potter, 1973.
 H. J., David Sandon. The Sandon guide to Royal Worcester figures: 1900–1970. Alderman Press, 1987. 
 Richard William Binns. Worcester China: A Record of the Work of Forty-five Years, 1852–1897. Adamant Media Corporation, 1897. 
 Derek Shirley. A Guide to the Dating of Royal Worcester — Porcelain Marks from 1862. Mid Wales Litho Ltd., Griffithstown, 1987.
 John Edwards. The Charlton Standard Catalogue of Royal Worcester Figurines. The Charlton Press, 2005. 
 Harry Frost. Royal Worcester Porcelain and the Dyson Perrins Collection. Pitkin, 1993. 
 Aileen Dawson. The Art of Worcester Porcelain, 1751–1788: Masterpieces from the British Museum Collection. UPNE, 2009. 
 Ray Jones. Porcelain in Worcester 1751–1951, An Illustrated Social History. Parkbarn, 1993. 
 S. Fisher. Worcester Porcelain. 1968.
 Tony Horsley. Distinguished Extinguishers. 1999.

External links 

 Official website
 Worcester Porcelain Museum website

1751 establishments in England
Companies based in Stoke-on-Trent
Ceramics manufacturers of England
English pottery
History of Worcester, England
British porcelain
Purveyors to the Imperial and Royal Court
British Royal Warrant holders
British companies established in 1751
Manufacturing companies established in 1751